List of motorcycles of the 1920s is a listing of motorcycles of the 1920s, including those on sale, introduced, or otherwise relevant in this period.

Motor cycle 

Abako
Ace Four (until 1924, see Indian Four)
Adma (motorcycle)
AFW (motorcycle)
Agon (motorcycle)
AJT motorcycles
AJS Model D (1912-1925)
AJS Model E (1925-1939)
AJW Summit
Albert (motorcycle)
Albertus (motorcycle)
Ascot-Pullin 500
Aussi Also
Blackburne motorcycles
Bayerische Flugzeugwerke Helios
Flink
BMW R32

BMW WR 750
Brennabor Typ A
Brennabor Typ N
Brennabor Typ Z
Brough Superior SS100
Brough Superior SS80
BSA Model L
BSA Sloper
Böhmerland (motorcycle)
Cleveland four-cylinder motorcycle
Excelsior Super X
FN Four (various version produced, 1905-1923)
Hanfland motorcycles (HFD)
Harley-Davidson Model A
Harley-Davidson Model AA
Harley-Davidson Model B
Harley-Davidson Model BA
Harley-Davidson Model W
Harley-Davidson Model 20-J
Harley-Davidson Model JD
Harley-Davidson Model AA
Henderson Motorcycle models
HRD Motorcycles models (this became Vincent in the 1930s)
Indian Ace
Indian Chief
Indian Four
Indian Prince
Indian Scout
Georges Roy's New Motorcycle
Georges Roy's The Majestic
Matchless Model X
Megola
Norton Big 4 (a.k.a. Model 1)
Norton CS1
Norton ES2
Norton 16H
Ner-A-Car
OEC
OEC-Blackburne
Phelon & Moore
Scott Flying Squirrel (1926-1939)
Triumph Werke Nürnberg Knirps, produced 1919–1923
Triumph Model H (1915-1923)
Triumph Model R
Triumph Model SD
Triumph Model P
Triumph Model Q
Triumph Model N
Victoria motorcycles
Victoria KR 1
Velocette KSS

Trike
Scott Sociable

Gallery

See also

Ford Model T
Horse and buggy
List of motorcycles by type of engine
List of motorcycles of 1900 to 1909
List of motorcycles of the 1910s
List of motorcycles of the 1930s
List of motorcycles of the 1940s
List of motorcycles of the 1950s
List of motorcycle manufacturers
List of motorized trikes
Safety bicycle

References

External links
Monovisions - Classic motorcycles of the 1920s
The Fastest Motorcycles of the 1920s - to Sell at Bonhams By  Andy Cherney Posted August 17, 2011
Motorcycle chariot racing of the 1920s and 30s
Company invoking 1920s style in motorcycle
BMW motorcycles of the 1920s

Lists of motorcycles
Motorcycles introduced in the 1920s